This is the discography for German-American music producer Toby Gad. The table below includes songs that he has either or both written/produced for other people.

References 

Discographies of American artists
Pop music discographies
Rock music discographies